The 2022 O'Reilly Auto Parts 150 at Mid-Ohio was the 15th stock car race of the 2022 NASCAR Camping World Truck Series, and the first iteration of the event. The race was held on Saturday, July 9, 2022, in Lexington, Ohio at Mid-Ohio Sports Car Course, a  permanent road course. The race took it's scheduled 67 laps to complete. After an exciting battle with 3 laps to go, Parker Kligerman, driving for Henderson Motorsports, held off Zane Smith for his third career NASCAR Camping World Truck Series win, and his first of the season. Kligerman would also dominate the race in general, leading 56 laps. To fill out the podium, Carson Hocevar, driving for Niece Motorsports, would finish in 3rd, respectively.

This was the debut race for Trey Burke, Connor Mosack, Kenko Miura, and Stephen Mallozzi.

Background 
Mid-Ohio Sports Car Course is a road course auto racing facility located in Troy Township, Morrow County, Ohio, United States, just outside the village of Lexington. Mid-Ohio has also colloquially become a term for the entire north-central region of the state, from south of Sandusky to the north of Columbus. It hosts a number of racing series such as IndyCar, IMSA WeatherTech Sportscar Championship, NASCAR Xfinity Series, and the ARCA Menards Series, along with other club events such has SCCA and National Auto Sport Association.

Entry list 

 (R) denotes rookie driver.

Practice 
The only 50-minute practice session was held on Friday, July 8, at 9:35 AM EST.

Qualifying 
Qualifying was held on Friday, July 8, at 3:35 PM EST. Since Mid-Ohio Sports Car Course is a road course, the qualifying system used is a two group system, with two rounds. Drivers will be separated into two groups, Group A and Group B. Each driver will have a lap to set a time. The fastest 5 drivers from each group will advance to the final round. Drivers will also have one lap to set a time. The fastest driver to set a time in the round will win the pole.

Round 2 was cancelled due to inclement weather.

Race results 
Stage 1 Laps: 15

Stage 2 Laps: 20

Stage 3 Laps: 32

Standings after the race 

Drivers' Championship standings

Note: Only the first 10 positions are included for the driver standings.

References 

2022 NASCAR Camping World Truck Series
NASCAR races at Mid-Ohio Sports Car Course
O'Reilly Auto Parts 150
2022 in sports in Ohio